The Pratapgarh district is one of the districts of Uttar Pradesh state of India, and Pratapgarh city is the district headquarters. Pratapgarh district is a part of Allahabad  division. The total area of Pratapgarh district is 3730 Sq. Km.

Wildlife 
The district has Ganga Dolphins in its river.

History
The city Pratapgarh is named by famous King of Somvanshi Dynasty, Raja Pratap Bahadur Singh a Rajput ruler who made a castle named Pratapgarh Mahal. After time around the areas of the castle was also known by, Pratapgarh;  In 1928, the arrival of Simon Commission in India led to widespread
agitations against the British government. Many of the talukdars took the lead in the movement and openly displayed their opposition against the Imperial Government. On July 10, the Congress politician Jawaharlal Nehru and Mohanlal Saxena, visited the Pratapgarh district to address a public meeting at Hadi Hall (in Bela Pratapgarh), they were welcomed by Brajesh Singh. The district was also visited by Mahatma Gandhi on November 14, 1929, who addressed a crowd of 5000 and was awarded a purse of Rs 5,570 by then-Raja Awadhesh Singh of Kalakankar.

Economy
In 2006 the Ministry of Panchayati Raj named Pratapgarh one of the country's 250 most backward districts (out of a total of 640). It is one of the 34 districts in Uttar Pradesh currently receiving funds from the Backward Regions Grant Fund Programme (BRGF).

Demographics

According to the 2011 census Pratapgarh district, Uttar Pradesh had a population of 3,209,141, roughly equal to the nation of Mongolia or the US state of Iowa. This gives it a ranking of 109th in India (out of a total of 640). Its population growth rate over the decade 2001-2011 was  16.2%. Pratapgarh had a sex ratio of 994 females for every 1000 males, and a literacy rate of 73.1%. Scheduled Castes made up 22.10% of the population.

At the time of the 2011 Census of India, 90.74% of the population in the district spoke Hindi, 6.02% Awadhi and 3.13% Urdu as their first language.

Administration
There are 17 blocks in Pratapgarh district.

Education

Notable persons

Munishwar Dutt Upadhyay, freedom fighter, later became only member of Constituent Assembly from Pratapgarh and twice elected Member of Parliament from Pratapgarh. 
Swami Karpatri Maharaj, spiritual leader and founder of Ramrajya party
Rajesh Kumar Mishra, leader and politician at Kisaan Morcha, BJP
Bajrang Bahadur Singh, founder vice chancellor of Pant Nagar University and later the first Governor of Himachal Pradesh state of India
Jagadguru Kripalu Maharaj (1922–2013), Hindu spiritual leader and saint from Mangarh, Pratapgarh
Dinesh Singh (1925-1995), Deputy Minister in the ministry of external affairs and served as a member of parliament
Harivansh Rai Bachchan (1907-2003) poet and professor of Allahabad University, best known for his early work Madhushala; father of Bollywood star Amitabh Bachchan
Raghuraj Pratap Singh (born 1969) known as Raja Bhaiya, politician, independent member of legislative assembly and MLA of Pratapgarh district Uttar Pradesh
Anupam Shyam Ojha (1957–2021), film and television actor, who usually played villainous role on international films set in India
Babulal Gaur (born 1930) BJP Leader and Ex. Chief Minister of Madhya Pradesh also hails from Pratapgarh.
Shweta Tiwari (born 1980), Bollywood and Bhojpuri film actress and winner of the fourth season of the reality show Bigg Boss
Rajkumari Ratna Singh (born 1959), politician from Indian National Congress Party, member of parliament.
Pramod Tiwari (born 1956), senior leader of Congress Party and EX MLA from (Rampur Khas), and current MP of Rajya Sabh Pratapgarh, Uttar Pradesh.
Lal Pratap Singh  freedom fighter.
Ajit Pratap Singh
Sumitranandan Pant (born 20 May 1900) was an Indian poet.

See also
 Munishwar Dutt Upadhyay
 Harivansh Rai Bachchan
 Harshpur

References

External links

 

 
Districts of Uttar Pradesh
1858 establishments in India